Eric Dean Seaton is an American television director, producer and graphic novelist.

Eric Dean Seaton was born in Cleveland, Ohio. After graduating from the Ohio State University, Seaton moved to California and quickly climbed the assistant director ladder on television shows such as “Living Single” and “That’s So Raven.”  In 2004, Seaton made his professional directing debut on Disney Channel's “That’s So Raven.”

Filmography

References

External links

Eric Dean Seaton Interview with Super Hero Speak

African-American television directors
American television directors
Television producers from Ohio
Living people
Ohio State University alumni
Place of birth missing (living people)
Year of birth missing (living people)
People from Cleveland
21st-century African-American people